Malcolm Forbes Rennie (born 17 February 1947) is a British actor.

Early life
Rennie was born on 17 February 1947, in Aberdeen, Scotland.

Career
He has often played authority figures, including judges and police officers in Coronation Street and The Execution of Gary Glitter. He also played Snout in a production of A Midsummer Night's Dream. He appears as Fraser in Mr Selfridge.

Personal life
He is married to the actress Tamara Ustinov, daughter of Peter Ustinov. The website About Aberdeen lists him as a famous Aberdonian.

Filmography

Film

Television

References

External links 

1947 births
Living people
20th-century British male actors
21st-century British male actors
British male soap opera actors
Male actors from Aberdeen
Ustinov family